Kupayevo (Qupay) is a rural locality (a village) in Rasmekeyevsky Selsoviet, Kushnarenkovsky District, Bashkortostan, Russia. The population was 140 as of 2010. There are 4 streets.

Geography 
Kupayevo is located 20 km southwest of Kushnarenkovo (the district's administrative centre) by road. Rasmekeyevo is the nearest rural locality.

References 

Rural localities in Kushnarenkovsky District